Las Tinajas may refer to:

Places
Mexico
Las Tinajas, Zinapécuaro, a village in Michoacán
Las Tinajas massacre, massacre in the above village

United States
Las Tinajas de Los Indios, tinajas in Antelope Valley